Ha Jung-Heon (born 14 October 1987) is a South Korean football player who plays as a forward for Ansan Mugunghwa.

He started his career at Korea National League side Ansan Police. On 17 November 2009, K-League side Gangwon FC called him as sixth order at 2010 K-League Draft. His first K-League match was against FC Seoul in Gangneung, that Gangwon lost by 0–3 in the first home game of the 2010 season on 6 March 2010.

Club career statistics 

Note: appearances and goals include championship playoffs.

References

External links

1987 births
Living people
Association football forwards
South Korean footballers
Suwon FC players
Gangwon FC players
Goyang KB Kookmin Bank FC players
Ansan Mugunghwa FC players
Korea National League players
K League 1 players
K League 2 players